Ticha may refer to:

People 
Feminine for of the Czech surname Tichý
Ticha Penicheiro (born 1974), Portuguese basketball player

Other 
Tichá, village in Moravian-Silesian Region, Czech Republic
Ticha Stadium, sports venue in Varna, Bulgaria
Ticha Reservoir, reservoir in Varbitsa Municipality, Shumen Province, Bulgaria
Ticha Peak, peak in Antarctica
5757 Tichá, main-belt asteroid